The East African Development Bank (EADB) is a development finance institution with the objective of promoting development in the member countries of the East African Community.

Overview
EADB plays a threefold role of lender, adviser, and development partner. The bank provides a range of products and services that are tailored for the region's development requirements. The bank has experience, financial backing, staff, and a knowledge of the region's financial requirements. , the institution's total assets were valued at approximately US$390.411 million, with shareholders' equity of approximately US$261.36 million.

History
EADB was established in 1967 under the treaty of the then East African Cooperation between Kenya, Tanzania, and Uganda. Following the breakup of the first East African Community (EAC) in 1977, the bank was re-established under its own charter in 1980. In 2008, following the admission  of Burundi and Rwanda into the new EAC, Rwanda applied and was admitted into the EADB. Under the new charter, the bank's role and mandate were reviewed and its operational scope expanded. Under its expanded operational scope, the bank offers a broad range of financial services in the member states. Its main objective is to strengthen socio-economic development and regional integration.

Ownership
The ownership of the EADB as of December 2013 is detailed in the table below.

, the bank's shareholders' equity totaled approximately US$166.03 million. In January 2013, the African Development Bank injected US$24 million into EADB in new equity, bringing its shareholding to 15 percent.

Awards
In November 2014, the Association of African Development Finance Institutions ranked EADB, "the best performing development finance institution in Africa" for the second consecutive year, with an AA rating. The bank was ranked the best out of 33 institutions that submitted to the evaluation.

Bank structure
EADB's structure is composed of the following;
 Governing Council
 Advisory Panel
 Board of Directors
 Management Team
The details of the current structure of EADB are outlined at the bank's website.

Branch network
The headquarters of the bank are located in Uganda's capital, Kampala. As of June 2014, EADB had three other branches, one each in the East African capitals of Nairobi, Kigali, and Dar-es-Salaam. A branch will be established in Bujumbura as soon as Burundi joins the bank.

See also

 World Bank
 PTA Bank
 Rwanda Development Bank
 Uganda Development Bank

References

External links
  EADB Website
 EADB head under probe over mismanagement claims

Banks of Uganda
Banks of Kenya
Banks of Rwanda
Banks of Tanzania
Companies based in Kampala
Multilateral development banks
Development finance institutions